Guardiagrele is a town and comune in the province of Chieti, part of the Abruzzo region of central Italy. Its population numbers about 10,000.

Commenting on the views of the mountains and valleys of the Maiella visible from some points in the town, the poet Gabriele d'Annunzio nicknamed Guardiagrele la terrazza d'Abruzzo ("Abruzzo's terrace").

Guardiagrele is the seat of the Maiella National Park, and was part of the club I Borghi più belli d'Italia (The most beautiful village of Italy).

Main sights 

The biggest church in Guardiagrele is Santa Maria Maggiore of which it has been written:

In addition to Santa Maria Maggiore, there are  several other churches and  palazzi or mansions of various ages which are of architectural interest, including   S. Nicola di Bari (founded in the 4th century), the convent of the Chapuchins (1599), Palazzo De Lucia (16th century), Palazzo Elisii (15th-18th century), the cloister of the  Palazzo Comunale Piazza San Francesco (17th century) and Palazzo Marini (1391).

Museums include:

 Museo Civico (Civic Museum)
 Museo del Costume e della Tradizione della Nostra Gente (Costume and Folk Museum)
 Museo del Duomo ("Cathedral Museum"), in Santa Maria Maggiore
 Museo Archeologico ("Archaeological Museum").

Culture

Known throughout Abruzzo for its wrought-iron craft, copper craft and gold-work, Guardiagrele was the home of the great goldsmith and sculptor Nicola da Guardiagrele, who was born there in the late 14th century.

The patron saints of Guardiagrele are Saint Donatus of Arezzo and Saint Emidius. Annually between the 6th and 8 August there is a festival celebrating these saints in which the effigy of Donatus is paraded around the streets of Guardiagrele. It is traditional to eat porchetta (oven or spit roasted suckling pig flavoured with pepper, rosemary, garlic and other seasonings) at this time.

In the 11th century Archimandrite Saint Nicholas the Greek led a group of monks fleeing the Saracens who had occupied Calabria. In 1338 his body was moved to Guardiagrele and interred in la Chiesa di San Francesco (14th century). His saint's day is celebrated on the third Sunday of May.

The church preserved in its choirbooks the important Guardiagrele Codex, of polyphonic works by Landini and anonymous composers.

People
 Morgan De Sanctis, footballer

References

External links
I Borghi più belli d'Italia - Entry on Guardiagrele 
Examples of the poetry of the dialect poet Modesto della Porta

 
Hilltowns in Abruzzo